Baryphyma trifrons is a species of dwarf spider in the family Linyphiidae. It is found in North America, Europe, the Caucasus, and in a range from Russian Europe to the Far East).

Subspecies
These two subspecies belong to the species Baryphyma trifrons:
 Baryphyma trifrons affine (Schenkel, 1930) i
 Baryphyma trifrons trifrons (O. P.-Cambridge, 1863) i
Data sources: i = ITIS, c = Catalogue of Life, g = GBIF, b = Bugguide.net

References

Linyphiidae
Articles created by Qbugbot
Spiders described in 1863